Krásna (literally: "beautiful" in English) is a borough (city ward) of the city of Košice, Slovakia. Despite new small-scale housing developments, it retains much of its rural character.

History 

The first written record of Krásna dates back to 1143. It was an independent village municipality until 1945, when it was connected with Košice.

In the past, it was also known under the municipal name Krásna nad Hornádom ("Krásna-upon-Hornád").

Evolution of the borough's name

Some of the recorded historical names of Krásna.

 1219 - abbas de Zebloc (Latin)
 1255 - Sceplok
 1280 - monast. Zceplak
 1288 - villa Zeplak
 1327 - poss. Zyplok
 1328 - Zeplak
 1335 - poss. Sceplok, Sceplak
 1337 - Zeplak
 1808 - Szýplak (Hungarian)  
 1906 - Siplak
 1918 - Krásna nad Hornádom (Slovak)

Statistics

 Area: 
 Population: 5,401 (31 December 2017) 
 Density of population: 270/km2 (31 December 2017) 
 District: Košice IV
 Mayor: Peter Tomko (as of 2018 elections)

Gallery

References

External links

 Official website of the Krásna borough
 Article on the Krásna borough at Cassovia.sk
 History of the manor house in Krásna
 Official website of Košice

Boroughs of Košice
Villages in Slovakia merged with towns